Goodbye to All That is a 2014 American romantic comedy-drama film written and directed by Angus MacLachlan in his directorial debut. It stars Paul Schneider and Melanie Lynskey. The film had its world premiere at the 2014 Tribeca Film Festival, and was released theatrically in the United States on December 17, 2014.

Synopsis
When Otto's wife suddenly asks for a divorce, he bounces between a social media-fueled search for answers, desperate attempts to reconnect with his daughter, and a fateful reentry into the dating pool.

Cast
 Paul Schneider as Otto Wall
 Melanie Lynskey as Annie Wall
 Audrey P. Scott as Edie Wall
 Anna Camp as Debbie Spangler
 Heather Graham as Stephanie
 Amy Sedaris as Holly
 Michael Chernus as Freddie
 Ashley Hinshaw as Mildred
 Heather Lawless as Lara
 Celia Weston as Joan

Production
The film began production in October 2012 with Epoch Films. Filming took place in and around Winston-Salem, North Carolina. In September 2014, IFC Films bought the distribution rights to the film.

Reception
 
Writing for The Hollywood Reporter, John DeFore summarized it as "a surprisingly sexy tale of emotional rebuilding". In his review for Vulture.com, Bilge Ebiri wrote: "Romantic comedies involving people moving on after divorce are a dime a dozen, but rarely are they as generous, sharply observed, and humane [as this]", and referred to the performances of Schneider and Lynskey as "fantastic". Peter Debruge of Variety called it an "amiable indie [that] rewards adult [audiences] who've outgrown cookie-cutter romantic comedies", while noting that Schneider was "irresistible" and describing Lynskey's body language as "heartbreaking ... This is what falling out of love looks like. It's not screaming matches and altercations; it's apathy and indifference".

Awards
Schneider received the award for Best Actor in a U.S. Narrative Feature at the 2014 Tribeca Film Festival, where the film also competed in the Best U.S. Narrative Feature category.

References

External links
 

2014 films
2014 independent films
2014 comedy-drama films
2014 romantic comedy-drama films
Films produced by Anne Carey
Films shot in North Carolina
American romantic comedy-drama films
2010s English-language films
2010s American films